Casey Mitchell may refer to:

 Casey Mitchell (Home and Away), a character on Home and Away
 Casey Mitchell (basketball) (born 1988), American basketball player

See also

 KC Mitchell, American powerlifter and former soldier